Every year, in the first month of summer, across the Indian state of Goa, cultish alcoholic beverage, Urrak, is made by the local folks.  It is very popular in the state's many local pubs and taverns.
While Feni is a double distilled alcoholic drink derived from fermentation of ripen cashew apple juice, Urrak is a product of first single distillation phase, completed in early spring. Urrak may contain sediments of the cashew apple, and has very low shelf life compared to the feni, and must be consumed as fresh as possible after the extraction.

Thus, in the first single distillation process, Urrak is obtained, and it contains 10-15% of alcohol approximately.

The Feni is a double distilled fine product of the same juice, and contains 40%-45% of alcohol approximately.  Feni comes with a good shelf life compared to the Urrak. Cashew feni is now available under renowned brand also.

Making of a fenny

First, handpicked, tree-ripened and fallen cashews are stomped, to gently extract the juices from the cashew apples, much the same way in winemaking. Just like a Brandy is distilled from grapes wine, feni is distilled from cashew apples wine. In the first stripping run of the distillation process, a cashew wine is distilled into a light alcohol, Urrak. It is the next distillation, the master distiller carefully controls the heat to allow the careful melange of water and alcohol to coax out the stronger second distillate (40-45%) spirit, Feni (liquor) with less flavor and more alcohol in it. The flavors come entirely from the Cashew apple and the earthly pot where it took root, while the character stands testament to the time-honoured knowledge that has been refined down through Goa's generations. Traditionally, Nothing is added in to this final product, that was not originally present, no flavourers, no colours, no aromas. But, nowadays, young distillers of the region, have adopted, European methods of aging, as, a result, one can see, flavored fenny, with flavours of Indian aromatic spices.

References

Goan cuisine
Indian distilled drinks
Indian cuisine